Woodland Park School District may refer to:
Woodland Park School District Re-2 - Colorado
Woodland Park School District (New Jersey)